Yela may refer to:

 Yela Island, an island in Papua New Guinea
 Yela, Liberia. a town in Liberia
 Yela language, a language spoken in the Democratic Republic of the Congo
 Rafael Yela Günther (1888–1942), Guatemalan painter and sculptor
 Yelawolf (1979-), American rapper

See also 
 Yella (disambiguation)
 Jela